Felix Zulauf (www.felixzulauf.com) (born 1950), is the owner and president of Zulauf Asset Management, a Zug, Switzerland-based hedge fund, which he founded in 1990 and now runs as his private family office. Zulauf Asset Management had $1.7 billion assets under management, according to MacroAxis. Zulauf has been a regular member of the Barron's Roundtable for almost 30 years. He now offers an institutional research service.

Zulauf started his investment career as a trader for Swiss Bank, then training in research and portfolio management in New York, Zurich and in Paris. He joined Union Bank of Switzerland in 1977, ultimately becoming the head of the institutional portfolio management unit and global strategist for the UBS Group.

In May 2014, Felix Zulauf and his son Roman have partnered with Universal-Investment to launch the Vicenda Multi Opportunities fund.

Climate Change

In June 2022, the magazine "the market" published a text by Zulauf, in which he questions man-made climate change, saying the scientific evidence is not given.

References

External links
 Felix Zulauf Blog
 "Stocks overdue for a rally? Even some mega-bears say so", LA Times, March 8, 2009 
 "Stocks May Suffer ‘Severe Correction’ This Year, Zulauf Says," BusinessWeek, January 14, 2010
 "The Big Picture Interview: Felix Zulauf," "The Big Picture Interview: Felix Zulauf," Ritholtz.com, August 2, 2010
 "Felix Zulauf interview part 1: All important banks have to be nationalized immediately" 8/25/2012

1950 births
Living people
Swiss chief executives
Swiss hedge fund managers
Swiss investors
Swiss money managers
Swiss stock traders